The forty-seventh edition of the Caribbean Series (Serie del Caribe) was played in 2005. It was held from February 1 through February 6 featuring the champion baseball teams of the Dominican Republic, Águilas Cibaeñas; Mexico, Venados de Mazatlán; Puerto Rico, Indios de Mayagüez, and Venezuela, Tigres de Aragua. The Series was held at Estadio Teodoro Mariscal in Mazatlán, Mexico.

Summary

Final standings

Individual leaders

All-Star team

See also
Ballplayers who have played in the Series

Sources
Latino Baseball (Spanish)
Mexicano Francisco Campos fue el jugador más valioso (Spanish)
Por quinta ocasión, México ganó la Serie del Caribe de beisbol (Spanish)

Caribbean
2005
International baseball competitions hosted by Mexico
2005 in Mexican sports
Mazatlán
2005 in Caribbean sport
Caribbean Series